The neutron scanner technology is non-intrusive used to minimise the impact of security measures on rapid freight movement.

The main advantage of the Scanner over current and potential new scanners is its ability to accurately and rapidly analyse the composition, shape and density of an object - in real-time without unpacking freight containers.

Conventional X-ray scanners are good at detecting objects based on their density and shape - but not their composition.

The Scanner is unique in the way it employs gamma rays and neutron analysis to build an image and help identify the composition of the object being scanned.

Export and import control
Imaging
Neutron-related techniques